The Clerget 7Z was a seven-cylinder rotary aircraft engine of the World War I era designed by Pierre Clerget. First appearing in 1911 it was nominally rated at 80 horsepower (60 kW). 347 examples were jointly built in Britain by Gordon Watney & Co Ltd of Weybridge and Gwynnes Limited of Hammersmith.

Applications
Avro 504
Beardmore W.B.III
Bristol S.S.A.
Caudron G.4
Mosca-Bystritsky MBbis
Royal Aircraft Factory B.E.8a
Royal Aircraft Factory S.E.2
Royal Aircraft Factory S.E.4
Sopwith Pup
Weymann W-1

Specifications (Clerget 7Z)

See also

References

Notes

Bibliography

 Gunston, Bill. World Encyclopaedia of Aero Engines. Cambridge, England. Patrick Stephens Limited, 1989. 
 Lumsden, Alec. British Piston Engines and their Aircraft. Marlborough, Wiltshire: Airlife Publishing, 2003. .

Air-cooled aircraft piston engines
1910s aircraft piston engines
7Z
Rotary aircraft piston engines